This is a list of archives which were held in India, which collect and store historical documents, photographs, shashtras and all the other media.

National Archives
 National Archives of India - established in Kolkata as the "Imperial Record Department" in 1891.
 National Film Archive of India
 National Mission for Manuscripts - established in New Delhi in 2003.

 Assam State Archives
 Uttar Pradesh State Archives- established at Lucknow in 1975. 
 Bihar state archives - established in Patna in 1912 as the Civil secretariat record room.
 Delhi archives - established in New Delhi in 1972.
 Goa state archives - established in Panaji on 25 February 1595 by Diogo do Couto and was called "Torre do Tombo do Estado da India".  The oldest record is from the year 1498.
 Haryana state archives 
 Himachal Pradesh state archives - established in 1979.
 Karnataka state archives - established in Bangalore in 1972.
 Kerala state archives - established in Thiruvanandapuram in 1962.
 Madhya Pradesh state archives - "The new State of Madhya Pradesh came into existence on 1st November 1956. It was carved out of the parts of old Madhya Pradesh (Central Provinces & Berar) the erstwhile States of Gwalior, Indore, Bhopal, Rewa and Madhya Bharat State."
 Maharashtra state archives - in Mumbai, Pune, Kolhapur and Vidarbha.
 Manipur state archives - established in Imphal in 1982 
 Mizoram state archives - established in Aizawl in 1979.
 Nagaland state archives - established Kohima in 2012.
 Odisha state archives
 Punjab state archives 
 Rajasthan state archives - is established in Bikaner.
 Tamil Nadu Archives previously known as Madras Record Office - established in 1909 at Madras.
 West Bengal state archives
Sarmaya Arts Foundation 
 Sikkim state archives
St Kuriakose Elias Chavara Archives and Research Centre Mannanam - established in Mannanam, Kottayam, Kerala as the "Church and Historical Archives"

Other archives
 Archives of Indian Labour - established in Noida in 1998.
 Bhandarkar Oriental Research Institute
 Gandhi Research Foundation, Gandhi Teerth, Jalgaon
 Indian Memory Project, Mumbai - established in 2010

See also
 List of museums in India
 Open access in India

References

 
archives
India
Archives
Archives